Pele's hair (closest modern Hawaiian translation: "") is a volcanic glass formation produced from cooled lava stretched into thin strands, usually from  lava fountains, lava cascades, or vigorous lava flows. It is named after Pele, the Hawaiian goddess of volcanoes. 

Mentions of this type of lava can be found in 18th Century Hawaiian newspapers where it is called "Lauoho o Pele," "Lauoho Pele," and "Lauoho ehuehu a Pele."

Wind often carries the light fibers high into the air and to places several kilometers away from the vent. It is common to find strands of Pele's hair on high places like treetops, radio antennas, and electric poles.

It is usually found in gaps in the ground, mostly near vents, skylights, ocean entry, or in corners where Pele's hair can accumulate.

It is not recommended to touch Pele's hair, because it is very brittle and very sharp, and small broken pieces can enter the skin. Gloves should be worn while examining it.

Pele's hair may occur along with Pele's tears. They indicate to  volcanologists information about the eruption, such as the temperatures and the magma's path to the surface. Plagioclase starts to crystallize from the magma of Pele's hair at around 1,160 °C (about 2120 °F). Also, the shape of the tears can provide an indication of the velocity of the eruption, and the bubbles of gas and particles trapped within the tears can provide information about the composition of the magma chamber.

Formation 

The strands are created when molten lava is ejected into the air and form tiny droplets, which elongate perfectly straight. It usually forms in lava fountains, lava cascades, and vigorous lava flows.

Features 
Pele's hair has a golden yellow color and looks like human hair or dry straw. In sunlight, it has a shimmering gold color. Length varies considerably, but is typically 5 to 15 cm, and can be up to 2 m. Hair diameter ranges from about 1 to 300 µm (0.001 to 0.3 mm), and therefore weight is accordingly low.

See also 
 Pele's tears
 Limu o Pele (Pele's seaweed)
 Mineral wool
 Glass wool
 Pele's Curse

References 

 Moune, Séverine; Faure, François; Gauthier, Pierre-j. (2007) Pele's hairs and tears: Natural probe of volcanic plume. Elsevier, Journal of Volcanology and Geothermal Research. France, p. 244-253
 M. Potuzak, M., Dingwell, D.B., Nichols, A.R.L. (2006) Hyperquenched Subaerial Pele’s Hair Glasses from Kilauea Volcano, Hawaii European Geosciences Union, v. 8
 Piccardi, L. and Masse, W. B. (2007) Myth and Geology Geological Society, London, Special Publications, 273, 1–7. The Geological Society of London, 2007
 Zimanowki, B., Buttner, R. Lorenz, V., Hafele, H-G. (1997) Fragmentation of Basaltic Melt in the Course of Explosive Volcanism. Journal of Geophysical Research, Vol. 102, No. B1, Pages 803-814
 Villmant, B.; Salaün, A. and Staudacher, T. (2009) Evidence for a Homogeneous Primary Magma at Piton De La Fournaise (La Réunion): A Geochemical Study of Matrix Glass, Melt Inclusions and Pélé's Hairs of the 1998–2008 Eruptive Activity. Journal of Volcanology and Geothermal Research, v. 184, p. 79-92

Bibliography 
 Gill, Robin. Igneous Rocks and Processes: A Practical Guide. Hoboken, N.J.: Wiley-Blackwell, 2010.
 Lopes, Rosaly. The Volcano Adventure Guide. Cambridge, UK: Cambridge University Press, 2005.
 MacDonald, Gordon Andrew; Abbott, Agatin Townsend; and Peterson, Frank L. Volcanoes in the Sea: The Geology of Hawaii. Honolulu: University of Hawaii Press, 1983.
 Morey, Kathy. Hawaii Trails: Walks, Strolls, and Treks on the Big Island. Berkeley, Calif.: Wilderness Press, 2006.
 Nimmo, Harry. Pele, Volcano Goddess of Hawai'i: A History. Jefferson, N.C.: McFarland & Co., 2011.

External links 

 Hawaii: Pele's Hair (Volcanic Glass) (video)
 USGS Photo Glossary: Pele's hair
 Lauoho Pele
 Lauoho Ehuehu a Pele
 Lauoho o Pele

Glass in nature
Eruption products
Volcanism
Pyroclastic rocks